Aomori 3rd district is a single-member constituency of the House of Representatives in the national Diet of Japan. It is located on the island of Honshu, in Aomori Prefecture, and includes the cities of Hirosaki, Goshogawara, and Ajigasawa.

As of 2015, the district was home to 240,102 constituents.

The district is represented by Jiro Kimura of the Liberal Democratic Party.

Areas Covered

Current District 
As of 5 January 2023, the areas covered by this district are as follows:

 Hirosaki
 Kuroishi
 Goshogawara
 Tsugaru
 Hirakawa
 Nishitsugaru District
 Nakatsugaru District
 Minamitsugaru District
 Kitatsugaru District

As a result of the abolition of Aomori's 4th district in 2017, this district moved to where the 4th district used to be and gained the town of Goshogawara and the district of Kitatsugaru from Aomori's 1st district, while Aomori's 2nd district absorbed the areas one under the control of the 3rd district

Areas covered from 2013-2017 
From redistrict in 2013 until the redistricting in 2017, the areas covered by this district were as follows:

 Hachinohe
 Sannohe District
 Sannohe
 Takko
 Nanbu
 Hashikami
 Shingō

The only change was that the town of Gonohe in Sannohe district was moved to the 2nd district.

Areas covered before 2013 
From its formation in 1994 until its first redistricting in 2013, the areas covered by this district were as follows:

 Hachinohe
 Sannohe District

Elected Representatives

Election Results

References 

House of Representatives (Japan)
Districts in Aomori Prefecture